French Ancien Régime Roman Catholic dioceses and ecclesiastical provinces were heirs of Late Roman civitates (themselves created out of Gaulish tribes) and provinces.

Historical sketch
Most of them were created during the first Christianization of Gaul, in the 3rd to 5th centuries.

But, at several occasions during the Middle Ages or the Ancien Régime, new dioceses were created, replacing older ones or carved out of them. For instance, the Albigensian Crusade entailed the creation of many new dioceses in the early 14th century. All the same, in 1789, on the eve of the French Revolution, the ecclesiastical map of France still very much recalled that of Roman Gaul. This explains why many dioceses and provinces did not coincide with French borders, with their head cities lying in present-day Belgium, Germany or Switzerland.

In 1790, this map was entirely revised to fit the new administrative map: dioceses were now to coincide with départements (the new administrative units). Ancien Régime dioceses all disappeared, then, in 1790. Many former bishoprics remained heads of the new dioceses, but many cities lost their bishop. Even so, in those cities, the former cathedral very often kept its rank as a cathedral church. This explains why many post-Revolutionary episcopal sees bear the name of several cities. For instance, in the département of the Drôme, only the city of Valence retained its bishop, the former episcopal sees of Die and Saint-Paul-Trois-Châteaux being suppressed, but the bishop retained the title of bishop of Valence, Die and Saint-Paul-Trois-Châteaux.

Here follows a list of Ancien Régime dioceses, as of 1789, on the eve of the Revolution. With the exception of those dioceses which were created in the Late Roman period (before the 6th century), whose date of creation generally cannot be established, we provide the date of creation and, when appropriated of suppression of the bishopric. Dioceses whose sees were not within the borders of the kingdom of France are in brackets.

Listing of dioceses by church province

Province of Aix (Narbonensis Secunda) 
Archdiocese of Aix
Diocese of Apt
Diocese of Fréjus
Diocese of Gap
Diocese of Riez
Diocese of Sisteron

Province of Arles (Viennensis Secunda) 
Archdiocese of Arles
Diocese of Marseille
Diocese of Orange
Diocese of Saint-Paul-Trois-Châteaux
Diocese of Toulon

out of which (1475):

Province of Avignon 

Archdiocese of Avignon — became a metropolitan see in 1475.
Diocese of Carpentras
Diocese of Cavaillon
Diocese of Vaison

Province of Auch (Novempopulania) 
Archdiocese of Auch — became head of the province between 7th and 9th century, following the demise of the former metropolitan see of Eauze
Diocese of Aire
Diocese of Bazas
Diocese of Dax, out of which:
Diocese of Bayonne — created late 8th century.
Diocese of Lectoure
Diocese of Lescar
Diocese of Oloron
Diocese of Saint-Bertrand-de-Comminges
Diocese of Saint-Lizier
Diocese of Tarbes

Province of Besançon (Maxima Sequanorum) 
Archdiocese of Besançon
Diocese of Basel
Diocese of Belley — moved to Belley in 537 (former see in Nyon).
Diocese of Lausanne

Province of Bordeaux (Aquitania Secunda) 
Archdiocese of Bordeaux
Diocese of Agen, out of which:
Diocese of Condom — Created 1317.
Diocese of Angoulême
Diocese of Périgueux, out of which:
Diocese of Sarlat — Created 1317.
Diocese of Poitiers, out of which:
Diocese of Luçon — Created 1317.
Diocese of La Rochelle — Created in 1317 with its see in Maillezais. Was moved to La Rochelle in 1648.
Diocese of Saintes

Province of Bourges (Aquitania Prima) 
Archdiocese of Bourges
Diocese of Clermont, out of which:
Diocese of Saint-Flour — Created 1317.
Diocese of Limoges, out of which:
Diocese of Tulle — Created 1317.
Diocese of Le Puy

out of which (1678):

Province of Albi 

Archdiocese of Albi — became a metropolitan see in 1678. Out of which:
Diocese of Castres — created 1317.
Diocese of Cahors
Diocese of Mende — moved to Mende in the 6th century (former see was in Javols).
Diocese of Rodez, out of which:
Diocese of Vabres — created 1317.

Province of Embrun (Alpes Maritimæ) 
Archdiocese of Embrun
Diocese of Digne
Diocese of Entrevaux — Actually in the hamlet of Glandèves.
Diocese of Grasse — Moved to Grasse in 1244 (former see in Antibes. Belonged to the province of Aix-en-Provence down to 1057.
Diocese of Nice
Diocese of Senez
Diocese of Vence

Province of Genoa 
(Province created in 1133: Northern Corsican sees belonged to this province)
Diocese of Mariana — The bishop resides in Bastia
Diocese of Nebbio — The bishop resides in Saint-Florent

Province of Lyon (Lugdunensis Prima) 
Archdiocese of Lyon, out of which:
Diocese of Saint-Claude — Created 1742.
Diocese of Autun
Diocese of Langres, out of which:
Diocese of Dijon — Created 1731.
Diocese of Chalon-sur-Saône
Diocese of Mâcon

Province of Mainz (Germania Prima) 
Diocese of Speyer
Diocese of Strasbourg
other dioceses wholly in Germany

Province of Narbonne (Narbonensis Prima) 
Archdiocese of Narbonne, out of which:
Diocese of Alet — Created 1317.
Diocese of Carcassonne — Created late 6th century.
Diocese of Montpellier — Created late 6th century. Moved to Montpellier in 1536 (former see in Maguelonne).
Diocese of Perpignan — Created late 6th century. Moved to Perpignan in 1602 (former see in Elne).
Diocese of Saint-Pons — Created 1317.
Diocese of Agde
Diocese of Béziers
Diocese of Lodève
Diocese of Nîmes, out of which:
Diocese of Alès — Created 1694
Diocese of Uzès

out of which (1317):

Province of Toulouse 

Archdiocese of Toulouse — Became a metropolitan see in 1317. Out of which:
Diocese of Lavaur — Created 1317
Diocese of Lombez — Created 1317
Diocese of Montauban — Created 1317
Diocese of Pamiers — Created 1295, out of which:
Diocese of Mirepoix — Created 1317
Diocese of Rieux — Created 1317
Diocese of Saint-Papoul — Created 1317

Province of Reims (Belgica Secunda) 
Archdiocese of Reims, out of which
Diocese of Laon — Created late 5th century.
Diocese of Amiens
Diocese of Beauvais
Diocese of Châlons-en-Champagne
Diocese of Senlis
Diocese of Soissons
Diocese of Noyon
Diocese of Thérouanne — Suppressed 1553, out of which:
Diocese of Boulogne — Created 1567.
Diocese of Saint-Omer — Created 1559.

out of which (1559):

Province of Cambrai 

Archdiocese of Cambrai — Became a metropolitan see in 1559.
Diocese of Arras
Diocese of Tournai
other dioceses in present-day Belgium, created in 1559.

Province of Mechelen/Malines 

Province and diocese of Mechelen created in 1559.
Diocese of Ypres — Created 1559.
other dioceses in present-day Belgium and the Netherlands, created in 1559.

Province of Pisa 
(Province created out of the Province of Rome in 1092: central and Southern Corsican sees belonged to this province)
Diocese of Ajaccio
Diocese of Aléria — The bishop resides in Cervione
Diocese of Sagone — The bishop resides in Vico

Province of Rouen (Lugdunensis Secunda) 
Archdiocese of Rouen
Diocese of Avranches
Diocese of Bayeux
Diocese of Coutances
Diocese of Évreux
Diocese of Lisieux
Diocese of Sées

Province of Tours (Lugdunensis Tertia) 
Archdiocese of Tours
Diocese of Angers
Diocese of Le Mans
Diocese of Nantes

Some dioceses of this province were part, in the 9th and 10th centuries, of an autonomous but

Short-lived Province of Dol 

Diocese of Dol — Created 6th century, was an autonomous archbishopric for about 1½ centuries after the mid 9th century.
Diocese of Quimper — Created 6th century.
Diocese of Rennes — Out of which a short-lived diocese of Redon in the 15th century.
Diocese of Saint-Brieuc — Created 6th century.
Diocese of Saint-Malo — Moved to Saint-Malo in the 12th century (former see was in Alet).
Diocese of Saint-Pol-de-Léon — Created 6th century.
Diocese of Tréguier — Created 6th century.
Diocese of Vannes

Province of Sens (Lugdunensis Quarta) 
Archdiocese of Sens
Diocese of Auxerre
Diocese of Nevers
Diocese of Troyes

out of which (1622):

Province of Paris 

Archdiocese of Paris — Became a metropolitan see in 1622.
Diocese of Chartres, out of which:
Diocese of Blois — Created 1697.
Diocese of Meaux
Diocese of Orléans

Province of Tarentaise (Alpes Graiæ et Pœninæ) 
Archdiocese of Tarentaise — Its see was in Moûtiers.
other sees in present-day Italy (diocese of Aosta) and Switzerland (diocese of Sion).

Province of Trier (Belgica Prima) 
(Archdiocese of Trier)
Diocese of Metz
Diocese of Toul, out of which:
Diocese of Nancy — Created 1777.
Diocese of Saint-Dié — Created 1777.
Diocese of Verdun

Province of Vienne (Viennensis Prima) 
Archdiocese of Vienne
Diocese of Die
Diocese of Geneva — In the 16th century, following the Reformation, the see was moved to Annecy but kept its name.
Diocese of Grenoble
Diocese of Maurienne
Diocese of Valence
Diocese of Viviers

External links 
 Digital Atlas of Roman and Medieval Civilization (layers Medieval Bishoprics and French dioceses ca. 1000)

Dioceses, Ancien Régime
History of Catholicism in France